Allan McMullen (2 June 1949 – 10 March 2021) was an Australian rules footballer who played for the St Kilda Football Club in the Victorian Football League (VFL).

Notes

External links 

1949 births
2021 deaths
Australian rules footballers from Victoria (Australia)
St Kilda Football Club players